Malinova may refer to:
 Maļinova, a village in Latvia
 Malinová (disambiguation)

See also